Suha may refer to:

 Suha (given name), a Sanskrit or Arabic feminine given name. Meaning "Star"
 Suha (Bratunac), a village in Bosnia and Herzegovina
 Suha, Živinice, a village in Bosnia and Herzegovina
 Suha, Iran, a village in Ardabil Province, Iran
 Suha (river), a river in Romania
 Suha, Škofja Loka, a village in Slovenia
 SUHA (computer science), the simple uniform hashing assumption for hash tables
 "Suha", a song from Xiu Xiu's debut album Knife Play